Anaproutia comitella is a moth of the Psychidae family. It is found in France, Germany, Switzerland, Austria, Slovenia, Croatia, Hungary, Romania and Bulgaria.

The wingspan is about 15 mm for males. Female are wingless. Adults are on wing in May and June.

The larvae feed on mosses and lichens and, after overwintering, also on leaves. Larvae can be found from the end of June to the beginning of May. The species overwinters in the larval stage.

References

Moths described in 1845
Psychidae
Moths of Europe